Australia competed at the 1976 Summer Olympics in Montreal, Quebec, Canada. 180 competitors, 146 men and 34 women, took part in 115 events in 20 sports. Australia performed poorly, winning one silver and four bronze medals, finishing thirty-second on the medals table. This result caused significant negative backlash within the country, and spurred Prime Minister Malcolm Fraser to set up the Australian Institute of Sport.

Medalists

Archery

In the second Olympic archery competition that Australia contested, the nation sent two women and two men. Only one archer, Terry Reilly, had Olympic experience. He dropped 11 places from his 1972 finish. 

Women's Individual Competition:
Carole Toy — 2305 points (→ 15th place)
Maureen Adams — 2114 points (→ 25th place)

Men's Individual Competition:
David Anear — 2407 points (→ 13th place)
Terry Reilly — 2331 points (→ 26th place)

Athletics

Men's 4 × 400 metres Relay
 Max Binnington, Peter Grant, Don Hanly, and Rick Mitchell
 Heat — 3:05.75 (→ did not advance)

Men's 5.000 metres
 David Fitzsimons
 Heat — did not start (→ did not advance, no ranking)

Men's 10.000 metres
 Chris Wardlaw
 Heat — 28:17.52
 Final — 28:29.91 (→ 12th place)
 David Fitzsimons
 Heat — 28:16.43
 Final — 29:17.74 (→ 14th place)

Men's 400m Hurdles 
 Don Hanly
 Heat — 51.90s (→ did not advance)
 Peter Grant
 Heat — 51.07s (→ did not advance)

Men's Long Jump 
 Chris Commons
 Heat — 7.46m (→ did not advance)

Men's Marathon
 Chris Wardlaw — 2:23:56 (→ 35th place)
 David Chettle — did not finish (→ no ranking)
 Ross Haywood — did not finish (→ no ranking)

Men's 20 km Race Walk
 Ross Haywood — 1:30:59 (→ 12th place)

Men's Hammer Throw 
 Peter Farmer
 Qualifying round — 69.92m
 Final — 68.00m (→ 12th place)

Basketball

Men's competition
Preliminary round (Group A):
 Lost to Cuba (89-111)
 Lost to Soviet Union (77-93)
 Defeated Mexico (120-117)
 Lost to Canada (69-81)
 Defeated Japan (117-79)
Classification Matches:
 5th/8th place: Lost to Italy (72-79)
 7th/8th place: Lost to Cuba (81-92) → 8th place
Team Roster:
 Robbie Cadee
 Ian Watson
 Andrew Campbell
 Tony Barnett
 Eddie Palubinskas
 Perry Crosswhite
 Russell Simon
 Michael Tucker
 Andris Blicavs
 Peter Walsh
 John Maddock
 Ray Tomlinson
Head coach: Lindsay Gaze

Boxing

Canoeing

Cycling

Twelve cyclists represented Australia in 1976.

Individual road race
 Clyde Sefton — 4:49:01 (→ 28th place)
 Remo Sansonetti — 4:49:01 (→ 34th place)
 Alan Goodrope — did not finish (→ no ranking)
 Peter Kesting — did not finish (→ no ranking)

Team time trial
 Ian Chandler
 Remo Sansonetti
 Sal Sansonetti
 Clyde Sefton

Sprint
 Ron Boyle — 20th place

1000m time trial
 Stephen Goodall — 1:08.610 (→ 12th place)

Individual pursuit
 Gary Sutton — 6th place

Team pursuit
 Stephen Goodall
 Kevin Nichols
 Geoff Skaines
 John Thorsen

Diving

Equestrian

Fencing

Three fencers, two men and one woman, represented Australia in 1976.

Men's foil
 Greg Benko
 Ernest Simon

Men's épée
 Greg Benko

Women's foil
 Helen Smith

Gymnastics

Hockey

Men's competition
Preliminary round (Group A)
 Defeated Malaysia (2-0)
 Defeated Canada (3-0)
 Defeated India (6-1)
 Lost to the Netherlands (1-2)
 Lost to Argentina (2-3)
 Replay: Defeated India (1-1, 5-4 after penalty strokes)
Semi-finals
 Defeated Pakistan (1-2)
Final
 Lost to New Zealand (0-1) →  Silver Medal
Team Roster
 ( 1.) Robert Haigh
 ( 2.) Ric Charlesworth
 ( 3.) David Bell
 ( 4.) Greg Browning
 ( 5.) Ian Cooke
 ( 6.) Barry Dancer
 ( 7.) Douglas Golder
 ( 8.) Wayne Hammond
 ( 9.) Jim Irvine
 (10.) Stephan Marshall
 (11.) Malcolm Poole
 (12.) Robert Proctor
 (13.) Graeme Reid
 (14.) Ronald Riley
 (15.) Trevor Smith
 (16.) Terry Walsh
Head coach: Mervyn Adams

Judo

Modern pentathlon

Two male pentathletes represented Australia in 1976.

Individual
 Peter Ridgway
 Peter Macken

Rowing

Sailing

Shooting

Mixed

Swimming

Water polo

Men's competition
Preliminary round (Group C)
 Lost to Hungary (6-7)
 Lost to West Germany (3-4)
 Lost to Canada (5-6)
Classification group
 Lost to Canada (3-4)
 Defeated Iran (8-2)
 Lost to Soviet Union (2-7)
 Tied with Mexico (4-4)
 Lost to Cuba (3-8) → 11th place
Team roster
Andrew Kerr
Charles Turner
David Neesham
David Woods
Edmond Brooks
Ian Mills
Paul Williams
Peter Montgomery
Randall Goff
Rodney Woods
Ross Langdon
Head coach: Tom Hoad

Weightlifting

Wrestling

See also
Australia at the 1974 British Commonwealth Games
Australia at the 1978 Commonwealth Games

References

1976 Summer Olympics
Olympics
Nations at the 1976 Summer Olympics